John Malhelm Berry Sill (November 23, 1831-1901) was American diplomat and educator who served as the United States Counsel-General to Korea, president of Michigan State Normal College (which is today known as "Eastern Michigan University"), and superintendent of Detroit Public Schools. He also served as a regent of the University of Michigan.

Educational career
Sill began a career as a teacher when he was 18.  When he was 22, he began studying at the State Normal School at Ypsilanti, graduating in 1854, the first man to have done so. In 1867, he was appointed a regent of the University of Michigan. He held this position through 1869. 

In February 1875, after the retirement of Duane Doty, Sill was elected by the Detroit Board of Education to be the superintendent of Detroit Public Schools. On July 28, 1881, the Detroit Board of Education approved Sill's plan to establish a normal school in Detroit, something that his predecessor had pushed unsuccessfully for throughout his tenure. That September, the Detroit Normal Training School for Teachers began offering classes at the city's only high school (located in the state's original capitol building). The school later became part of what is today Wayne State University.

Sill served as Detroit superintendent until becoming president of Michigan State Normal College, a position he was elected to on July 22, 1886. He held the college's presidency until 1893.

Consul-General to Korea
Sill served as United States Consul General (ambassador) to Korea from 1894 to 1897, during a time that has been described as “one of the most turbulent periods of Korean history. During his tenure as Consul-General, Korea went through the Sino-Japanese War, the Gabo Reform, the murder of Queen Myeongseong, and King Gojong's refuge in the Russian legation.

Legacy
Sill Hall at Eastern Michigan University, as Michigan State Normal is now known, is named for Sill.

References

American consuls
Ambassadors of the United States to Korea
1831 births
1901 deaths
University of Michigan alumni
Presidents of Eastern Michigan University
Superintendents of Detroit Public Schools Community District
Regents of the University of Michigan